Chloe Anne Peplow (born 3 December 1998) is an English football midfielder who plays for Southampton on loan from Reading. She has represented England on the under-17 and under-19 national teams.

Playing career

Birmingham City, 2015–2017 
At the age of 16, Peplow signed with Birmingham City in December 2014 for the 2015 FA WSL season.  She made her debut for the senior team during a 3–0 win over Bristol City on 5 September 2015. After signing her first professional contract with the club and returning for the 2016 FA WSL season, Peplow made 13 appearances for the club. She appeared as a substitute for Andrine Hegerberg in Birmingham's 4–1 2017 FA Women's Cup Final defeat by Manchester City.

She was sent on loan to FA WSL 2 club Doncaster Rovers Belles on transfer deadline day in September 2017.

Tottenham Hotspur 
After the loan spell, at Doncaster, ended, she left the club to join Super League side, Tottenham Hotspur. Throughout her 2 years at the club, she got 20 appearances in different competitions. She scored 0 goals in these appearances and in the 2021 Transfer Window, she joined the Reading Women's Team.

Reading 
On 8 July 2021, Reading confirmed they had signed the midfielder for an undisclosed amount.

International 
Peplow has represented England on the under-15, under-17, and under-19 national teams. She competed at the U17 and U19 European Championships.

Career statistics

Honours

England U20s
FIFA U-20 Women's World Cup third place: 2018

 Birmingham City
 FA WSL Cup runner-up: 2016
 FA Women's Cup runner-up: 2017

References

External links
 
 Brighton & Hove Albion player profile 
 
 

1998 births
Living people
Sportspeople from Redditch
English women's footballers
Women's association football midfielders
Women's Super League players
Birmingham City W.F.C. players
Doncaster Rovers Belles L.F.C. players
Brighton & Hove Albion W.F.C. players
Tottenham Hotspur F.C. Women players
Reading F.C. Women players
Crystal Palace F.C. (Women) players
Southampton F.C. Women players
England women's youth international footballers